Eceköy (also: Ece) is a quarter of the town Tefenni, Tefenni District, Burdur Province, Turkey. Its population is 47 (2021).

References

Populated places in Tefenni District